Events in Italy in 1996:

Incumbents
 President – Oscar Luigi Scalfaro
 Prime Minister – Lamberto Dini (until 17 May), Romano Prodi (starting 17 May).

Events

 Vulcanair is founded, as did airline company Minerva Airlines.
January 23: 11 people die in the Secondigliano district, in Naples, due to the Secondigliano tragedy.
 February 26: The Democratic Alliance dissolves and is succeeded by the Democratic Union. 
 February 27: The political party Italian Renewal is founded.
 August 10: a little girl named Angela Celentano, who disappeared near Naples, the little girl was never found again.

Elections

 Italian general election, 1996
 Italian Senate election in Lombardy, 1996
 Sicilian regional election, 1996

Sport

 1995–96 Serie A
 1995–96 Serie B
 1995–96 Coppa Italia
 1996 Supercoppa Italiana
 1996 Torneo di Viareggio
 1995–96 Serie A (ice hockey) season
 1995–97 FIRA Trophy
 1996 Italian Grand Prix
 1996 San Marino Grand Prix
 1996 Italian motorcycle Grand Prix
 1996 Giro d'Italia
 Italy at the 1996 Summer Olympics
 Italy at the 1996 Summer Paralympics

Film

 53rd Venice International Film Festival

Births
1 February – Gianluigi Quinzi, Italian tennis player
17 February – Erika Fasana, Italian artistic gymnast

Deaths
February 29 – Mario Zagari, 82, politician
March 31 – Nino Borsari, 84, cyclist
May 25 – Renzo De Felice, 67, historian 
May 31 – Luciano Lama, 74, syndicalist
June 14 – Gesualdo Bufalino, 75, writer
June 18 – Gino Bramieri, 69, comedian
December 8 – Prince Eugenio, Duke of Genoa, 90, member of House of Savoy
December 15 – Giuseppe Dossetti, 83, politician and priest
December 19 – Marcello Mastroianni, 72, actor

References

 
Italy
Years of the 20th century in Italy
1990s in Italy
Italy